Gary Leroy Brown (July 1, 1969 – April 10, 2022) was an American professional football player who was a running back for eight seasons in the National Football League (NFL) for three teams from 1991 to 1999. Brown played college football at Penn State and was drafted by the Houston Oilers in the eighth round of the 1991 NFL Draft. He was also the running backs coach at the University of Wisconsin.

Playing career 

Brown played for three teams during his time in the NFL and rushed for over 1,000 yards twice in his career, first with the Houston Oilers during the 1993 season with 1,002 yards and then for the New York Giants during the 1998 season with 1,063 yards.

Coaching career 
After retiring from professional football following the 1999 season, Gary returned to Williamsport and was hired as an assistant coach at his alma mater, Williamsport High School, and at Lycoming College from 2003 to 2005. From 2006 to 2007, he served as offensive coordinator at Susquehanna University. In February 2008, he was named running backs coach at Rutgers University.  Brown accepted a position with the Cleveland Browns in February 2009, as the running backs coach on Eric Mangini's staff.  In February 2013, Brown was hired with the Dallas Cowboys as their running backs coach. In March 2021, Brown was hired as the running backs coach at the University of Wisconsin.

Death
The 52-year-old coach and father of three had been in hospice care in his hometown of Williamsport, Pennsylvania, due to ongoing health concerns, which had led to him stepping down from coaching. Brown died April 10, 2022, from cancer.

NFL career statistics

References

External links
 Dallas Cowboys bio

1969 births
2022 deaths 
Deaths from cancer in Pennsylvania
African-American players of American football
American football running backs
Cleveland Browns coaches
Dallas Cowboys coaches
Houston Oilers players
Lycoming Warriors football coaches
New York Giants players
Penn State Nittany Lions football players
Rutgers Scarlet Knights football coaches
San Diego Chargers players
Susquehanna River Hawks football coaches
High school football coaches in Pennsylvania
Sportspeople from Williamsport, Pennsylvania
Players of American football from Pennsylvania